Michael Callen (April 11, 1955 – December 27, 1993) was an American singer, songwriter, composer, author, and AIDS activist. Callen was diagnosed with AIDS in 1982 and became a pioneer of AIDS activism in New York City, working closely with his doctor, Dr. Joseph Sonnabend, and Richard Berkowitz. Together, they published articles and pamphlets to raise awareness about the correlation between risky sexual behaviors and AIDS.

As a major contributor to the foundation of AIDS activism, specifically activism from people with AIDS, Callen helped draft unprecedented documents such as How to Have Sex in an Epidemic: One Approach, and The Denver Principles. In addition to his written work, Callen was a leader and founder of activist organizations including The People with AIDS Coalition and the Community Research Initiative. As a musician, he was a member of the openly gay and politically active a cappella quintet The Flirtations and released two solo albums: Purple Heart in 1988 and Legacy in 1996. He consistently spoke out for AIDS activist and gay and lesbian organizations and made frequent speaking and performance appearances. Callen remained a primary public figure in AIDS activism until he died at age 38 from AIDS-related complications of pulmonary Kaposi's sarcoma at Midway Hospital in Los Angeles, California.

AIDS activist

Activism with Sonnabend, Berkowitz, and Dworkin 
In 1983, Callen co-authored the book How to Have Sex in an Epidemic: One Approach, which outlined the tenets of safe sex, developed in collaboration with Richard Berkowitz and Dr. Joseph Sonnabend. In 1990, he wrote Surviving AIDS, which received an Honorable Mention from the American Medical Writers Association.

Inspired by Sonnabend's theory, Callen joined with fellow person with AIDS Richard Berkowitz and partner Richard Dworkin to write an essay entitled “We Know Who We Are: Two Gay Men Declare War on Promiscuity” for the New York Native. What the men referred to as “promiscuity” was the frequent backroom, unprotected sexual encounters that dominated the gay sexual culture of the time and place. In the post-Stonewall Riots and gay liberation years, the popular belief was that sex was a revolutionary act, and more sex was equivalent to being more liberated.

The essay, in which gay men with AIDS placed the blame on themselves and their community for the spread of the disease, was controversial. Callen and Berkowitz were criticized for their alleged internalized homophobia and potentially detrimental stance on AIDS. Berkowitz and Callen, however, highlighted their authority to speak out against promiscuity as gay men with AIDS.

In 1990 he appeared in Rosa von Praunheim's documentary Positive .

Denver Principles and People With AIDS Advocacy 
Callen went on to become a pioneer advocate for the representation of people with AIDS in AIDS activism leadership. In 1983, the idea of people with AIDS representing themselves in activism brought Michael Callen to an AIDS forum in Denver. The people with AIDS at the forum attended workshops and exchanged stories of their experiences with AIDS through caucuses.

Callen and Bobbi Campbell became delegates for the other men in attendance, and the two of them synthesized the consensus reached over the course of the forum in the Denver Principles. The document was read during the closing session of the conference and was met with an immediate embrace from the audience of gay and lesbian medical professionals.

The Denver Principles consist of four sections: recommendations for health care professionals, recommendations for all people, recommendations for people with AIDS, and rights of people with AIDS. The principles establish the identifier of People With AIDS as opposed to “victim” or “patient,” encourage health care professionals to carefully consider the emotional and psychological effects of AIDS in addition to the medical, highlight the importance of activism and ally-ship from within and outside the community of People With AIDS, and affirms the basic yet fundamental rights including life, love, dignity, and medical confidentiality, of People with AIDS. The Denver Principles draw inspiration from Campbell's nursing background, Callen's work with his doctor, and concepts from women's health activism, as well as the testimonies of men at the forum. They ultimately led to the founding of the National Association of People With AIDS (NAPWA).

Organizational Leadership and Later Activism 
Callen was the founder of numerous grassroots organizations in various arenas of AIDS activism. He co-founded the New York People With AIDS Health Group, an underground buyer's club that provided access to new drugs and treatments for AIDS and AIDS related illnesses before the FDA approved them, prompting the FDA to ease restrictions and regulations in the drug approval process. He also founded the Community Research Initiative for people with AIDS and their doctors to test new drugs through clinical trials.

Callen was frequently seen on television talking about AIDS. Appearances included Nightline, Good Morning America, 20/20, and The Phil Donahue Show. He wrote for several newspapers and magazines, including the Village Voice, The New York Native, and Outweek; some of his articles are collected in Surviving and Thriving with AIDS, published by the People with AIDS Coalition in 1988. He also appeared in German filmmaker Rosa Von Praunheim's 1990 film Positiv - Die Antwort schwuler Männer in New York auf AIDS.

Opposition 
Despite his career and prominence as an activist, Callen was met with resentment, suspicion and opposition from others. Since he was diagnosed with AIDS in 1982 and survived over a decade, people speculated as to whether his diagnosis was real or fabricated to get attention. He responded to that criticism by releasing his medical reports and pictures of his lungs which showed his pulmonary Kaposi's Sarcoma. Additionally, Callen stood by his belief in the multifactorial theory when there was scientific proof that HIV was the cause of AIDS.

Callen openly questioned the HIV theory of AIDS and was especially critical of AZT monotherapy when it was first introduced: "The HIV paradigm has produced nothing of value for my life and I actually believe that treatments based on the arrogant belief that HIV has proven to be the sole and sufficient cause of AIDS has hastened the deaths of many of my friends."

Honors
In June 2019, Callen was one of the inaugural fifty American “pioneers, trailblazers, and heroes” inducted on the National LGBTQ Wall of Honor within the Stonewall National Monument (SNM) in New York City’s Stonewall Inn. The SNM is the first U.S. national monument dedicated to LGBTQ rights and history, and the wall’s unveiling was timed to take place during the 50th anniversary of the Stonewall riots.

Performance career 
Michael Callen briefly was the lead of the a cappella group Mike & the Headsets. In 1982, Callen, along with Janet Cleary, Pamela Brandt, and Richard Dworkin formed a queer rock-and-roll band called Low Life. After Low Life disbanded, Callen's solo album Purple Heart was released and quickly acclaimed as a staple of gay men's music.

He was a founding member of the gay male a cappella singing group The Flirtations, with whom he recorded two albums. He also had a solo album, Purple Heart, which a review in The Advocate called "the most remarkable gay independent release of the past decade." Callen recorded two albums with The Flirtations, as well as a double disc album, Legacy, which was released by Significant Other Records in 1996 after Callen's death.

Additionally, Callen made cameo appearances in the films Philadelphia (1993) and Zero Patience (1993), in which he famously performed a song in falsetto as the fictitious "Miss HIV".

In partnership with Oscar winner Peter Allen and Marsha Melamet, Callen wrote his most famous song, "Love Don't Need a Reason", commissioned by Larry Kramer for his play, The Normal Heart. The song was introduced at a 1986 AIDS Walk and was performed frequently at gay pride and AIDS-related events around the country. The song has been covered by numerous gay men's choirs as well as the Peter Allen Broadway musical The Boy From Oz (1998).

Bibliography
1983: How to Have Sex in an Epidemic: One Approach (co-author)
1990: Surviving AIDS (author)

Discography

Albums
as part of The Flirtations
The Flirtations (1990)
The Flirtations: Live Out on the Road (1991)
Feeding The Flame: Songs By Men to End AIDS (1992)
Solo
Purple Heart
Legacy – a 2-CD album (posthumously)

Filmography
Zero Patience (1993) - Miss HIV
Philadelphia (1993) - The Flirtations (final film role)

See also

 Callen-Lorde Community Health Center, an organization in New York City named for Michael Callen and Audre Lorde.
 ACRIA – Started as Community Research Initiative, an organization co founded by Callen and Joseph Sonnabend.
Love Don't Need A Reason: The Life and Music of Michael Callen (Punctum Books, 2020) by Dr. Matthew J. Jones

References

External links
 Official posthumous home page of Michael Callen
 
 Remarks of Michael Callen to the New York congressional delegation 1983 at  TheBody.com
 Photographs of the real people from Randy Shilts' history of the AIDS crisis And the Band Played On

1955 births
1993 deaths
Fiorello H. LaGuardia High School alumni
American gay writers
Songwriters from Indiana
American male pop singers
LGBT people from Indiana
American LGBT singers
American LGBT songwriters
HIV/AIDS denialists
AIDS-related deaths in California
HIV/AIDS activists
Gay singers
Gay songwriters
American health activists
American gay musicians
People from Rising Sun, Indiana
20th-century American singers
20th-century American non-fiction writers
Radical Faeries members
20th-century American male writers
American male non-fiction writers
20th-century American male singers
20th-century American LGBT people
American male songwriters